VCU is an acronym for Virginia Commonwealth University, a large public research university with two main campuses located in downtown Richmond, Virginia.

VCU may also refer to:
 Value for Cultivation and Use (seed test)
 Vantage Credit Union
 VCU Rams, the intercollegiate athletic program of said university
 Veridian Credit Union
 Vessel Capacity Unit (Fishing Vessels within European Union)
 Viscous coupling unit
 Voluntary Carbon Unit
 Vought Cinematic Universe
 VyStar Credit Union

See also
 VCUG
 VCUKI